The city of Anazarbus was an archdiocese of the Syriac Orthodox Church, attested between the sixth and twelfth centuries. Nearly thirty Syriac Orthodox bishops or metropolitans of Anazarbus are mentioned either by Michael the Syrian or in other Syriac Orthodox narrative sources.  The archdiocese is last mentioned towards the end of the twelfth century, and seems to have lapsed in the early decades of the thirteenth century.

Sources 

The main primary source for the Syriac Orthodox metropolitans of Anazarbus is the record of episcopal consecrations appended to Volume III of the Chronicle of the Syriac Orthodox patriarch Michael the Syrian (1166–99).  In this Appendix Michael listed most of the bishops consecrated by the Syriac Orthodox patriarchs of Antioch between the ninth and twelfth centuries.  Twenty-eight Syriac Orthodox patriarchs sat during this period, and in many cases Michael was able to list the names of the bishops consecrated during their reigns, their monasteries of origin, and the place where they were consecrated.  For the sixth and seventh centuries, Michael's lists are supplemented by several references in other Syriac Orthodox narrative sources.

Location 
Anazarbus was a large city of Cilicia, which lay on the river Pyramus or Gihon, 24 miles away from Sis.  The city was the metropolis of the Chalcedonian ecclesiastical province of Cilicia Secunda.  It was an obvious site for a Syriac Orthodox diocese, and was the seat of a Syriac Orthodox bishop or metropolitan as early as the sixth century.  It is one of the oldest attested Jacobite dioceses.

Bishops and metropolitans of Anazarbus

Sixth- and seventh-century bishops 
The Jacobite diocese of Anazarbus is attested between the sixth and twelfth centuries.  The earliest known Jacobite bishop of Anazarbus, Yohannan (Iwanis), consecrated the patriarch Sargis of Tella (538–40).

Two seventh-century Jacobite bishops of Anazarbus are known: Stephen (680/1) and Isidore (692).

Eighth- to twelfth-century bishops 
Twenty-five Syriac Orthodox metropolitans of Anazarbus from the end of the eighth century to the end of the twelfth century are mentioned in the lists of Michael the Syrian.

Further details of some of these bishops are supplied in the narrative sections of the Chronicle of Michael the Syrian and in the Chronicon Ecclesiasticum of Bar Hebraeus:

The metropolitan Habib (887/895) consecrated the patriarch Basil I at Rusafa in 923.
The metropolitan Laʿzar (958/961) consecrated the patriarch Athanasius IV (987–1003), in the village of Qatini in the Gihon region.
The metropolitan Athanasius (1129/1137), the uncle of the patriarch Michael I, must have been consecrated c.1133, as in 1166 he had been bishop of Anazarbus for 'more than 33 years'.  In the same year Michael I consecrated three bishops at Antioch, one of whom was Athanasius (1166/1199), who replaced him.

The archdiocese of Anazarbus is not mentioned in any later source, and probably lapsed in the early decades of the thirteenth century, perhaps on the death of Athanasius (1166/1199).

Notes

References 
 
 
 Jean-Baptiste Chabot, Chronique de Michel le Syrien, Patriarche Jacobite d'Antiche (1166-1199). Éditée pour la première fois et traduite en francais I-IV (1899;1901;1905;1910; a supplement to volume I containing an introduction to Michael and his work, corrections, and an index, was published in 1924. Reprinted in four volumes 1963, 2010).

Syriac Orthodox dioceses
Oriental Orthodoxy in Turkey